Mount Pauline is located on the border of Alberta and British Columbia. It is the 26th most prominence in Alberta. It was named in 1925 after F.A. Pauline. The three slopes are covered in mostly metamorphic shale or slate, due to this it is unknown how difficult it would be to climb to the peak.

See also
 List of peaks on the Alberta–British Columbia border
 Mountains of Alberta
 Mountains of British Columbia

References

Pauline
Pauline
Pauline